John Patience is an English author and illustrator. He is best known for his Fern Hollow series of books for young children.

Background
He is trained in typography and book design and he has been a published author and illustrator of children's books since 1979, with more than 140 published titles to date, selling all around the world.

John's Tales from Fern Hollow Books
 The Seasons in Fern Hollow
 Granny Bouncer's Rescue
 The Tortoise Fair
 Muddles at the Manor
 Sigmund's Birthday Surprise
 Mr Rusty's New House
 The Unscary Scarecrow
 The Brass Band Robbery
 Sports Day
 Brock the Balloonist
 Parson Dimly's Treasure Hunt
 Mrs Merryweather's Letter
 The Floating Restaurant
 Castaways on Heron Island
 The Midsummer Banquet
 The Mysterious Fortune Teller
 Spike and the Cowboy Band

References

External links
 Fern Hollow Animal Stories
 John Patience Foreign Rights Available for Licensing
 Talewater Press - John's own publishing imprint

1949 births
Living people
English children's writers
English male writers